San Diego Unified School District (formerly known as San Diego City Schools) is the school district based in San Diego, California, United States. It was founded in 1854. As of 2005 it represents over 200 institutions and has over 15,800 employees. The average teacher in the district makes around $67,000 a year, with a benefit package worth around $24,000 a year. The district includes 113 elementary schools, 24 middle schools, 4 atypical schools, 10 alternative schools,  27 high schools and 25 charter schools.

School board
The district is governed by a five-member elected board of education. Board members are elected by district for four-year terms.

Superintendent
The superintendent is appointed by the school board. From 2010 through 2013 the superintendent was Bill Kowba, a retired Navy rear admiral. On February 26, 2013, Kowba announced his retirement, effective June 30. The next day, February 27, the school board unanimously appointed elementary school principal Cindy Marten as the new superintendent. The quick appointment, without a search process or community input, was described as "highly unusual - virtually unheard of" by the San Diego Union Tribune. On May 18, 2021, Marten left her job as superintendent to become the United States deputy secretary of education, with Lamont Jackson replacing her as the interim superintendent.

Schools

List of primary and secondary schools in San Diego organized by district

Partnership with Ocean Discovery Institute 
In 2017, the district partnered with the Ocean Discovery Institute, a nonprofit that works to teach kids about science and conservation, to bring a $15 million tuition-free learning and research center to the City Heights neighborhood.  The building will be a permanent campus for the nonprofit and will include two laboratories, a garden, a community kitchen and a residence for a live-in staff member.  The Living Lab allows the nonprofit to reach all 10,000 students that attend and feed into Hoover High School.

Farm to School Program 
In 2010, the district launched a farm to school program in an effort to bring locally grown produce to schools. The program seeks to provide students access to as much local, regional, and California grown produce as possible. In addition to produce grown at farms, the district has a Garden to Café program which allows schools to be certified by the San Diego Department of Environmental Health allowing the school to grow and serve their own produce.

See also

San Diego Unified School district is the second largest school district in California and the largest in San Diego County. The district covers most of San Diego with the exception of San Ysidro, which is served by San Ysidro Elementary School District and Sweetwater Union High School District.

References

External links
 
 San Diego County Office of Education

School districts in San Diego County, California
Education in San Diego
School districts established in 1854
1854 establishments in California